Cytharomorula is a genus of sea snails, marine gastropod mollusks in the family Muricidae, the murex snails or rock snails.

Species
Species within the genus Cytharomorula include:
 Cytharomorula absidata Houart, Zuccon & Puillandre, 2019
 Cytharomorula ambonensis (Houart, 1996)
 Cytharomorula arta Houart, Zuccon & Puillandre, 2019
 Cytharomorula benedicta (Melvill & Standen, 1895)
 Cytharomorula danigoi Houart, 1995
 Cytharomorula dollfusi (Lamy, 1938)
 Cytharomorula elegantula Houart, Zuccon & Puillandre, 2019
 Cytharomorula fatuhivaensis Houart, Zuccon & Puillandre, 2019
 Cytharomorula grayi (Dall, 1889)
 Cytharomorula lefevreiana (Tapparone-Canefri, 1880)
 Cytharomorula manusuduirauti Houart, Zuccon & Puillandre, 2019
 Cytharomorula ornamentata (Houart, 1995)
 Cytharomorula paucimaculata (Sowerby III, 1903)
 Cytharomorula pinguis Houart, 1995
 Cytharomorula severnsi Houart, 2020
 Cytharomorula springsteeni Houart, 1995
 Cytharomorula vexillum Kuroda, 1953
Species brought into synonymy
 Cytharomorula pleurotomoides (Reeve, 1845): synonym of Orania pleurotomoides (Reeve, 1845)

References

 Kuroda, T. (1953) New genera and species of Japanese Gastropoda (1). Venus, 17, 179–185
 Houart R., Zuccon D. & Puillandre N. (2019). Description of new genera and new species of Ergalataxinae (Gastropoda: Muricidae). Novapex. 20 (Hors série 12): 1-52.

 
Ergalataxinae